Antony Collins may refer to:

Antony Collins (racehorse trainer), see Gay Future
Antony Collins (inline hockey), player for Australia men's national inline hockey team

See also
Anthony Collins (disambiguation)
Tony Collins (disambiguation)